Pokrass is a common Ashkenazi Jewish surname. 
 Pokrass brothers, composing team
Dmitry Pokrass (1899–1978), Soviet composer
Samuel Pokrass (1897–1939), Soviet-American composer
Sian Barbara Allen (b. 1946), American actress (born Barbara Susan Pokrass)